Grupo Desportivo Resende is a Portuguese football club located in Resende, Portugal. Resende was founded on 13 May 1929.

Colours and badge 
Resende's colours are blue and white.

References

External links 
 Official website
 Soccerway Profile
 Fora de Jogo Profile
 FPF Profile

Football clubs in Portugal
Association football clubs established in 1929
1929 establishments in Portugal